Glorieta La Normal (or Glorieta de La Normal) is a roundabout in Guadalajara, in the Mexican state of Jalisco. The area is serviced by the La Normal railway station.

References

Guadalajara, Jalisco
Roundabouts and traffic circles in Mexico